

iq-ir
iquindamine (INN)
Iquix
iralukast (INN)
iratumumab (INN, USAN)
irbesartan (INN)
Iressa
irindalone (INN)
irinotecan (INN)
irloxacin (INN)
irolapride (INN)
iroplact (INN)
irsogladine (INN)

is

isa-ism
isaglidole (INN)
isalsteine (INN)
isamfazone (INN)
isamoltan (INN)
isamoxole (INN)
isavuconazole (INN)
isaxonine (INN)
isbogrel (INN)
isbufylline (INN)
iscotrizinol (USAN)
iseganan (USAN)
isepamicin (INN)
Ismelin
Ismo
ismomultin alfa (USAN)
Ismotic

iso

isoa-isol
isoaminile (INN)
isobromindione (INN)
isobutamben (INN)
Isocaine
isocarboxazid (INN)
Isoclor
isoconazole (INN)
isocromil (INN)
isoetarine (INN)
isofezolac (INN)
isoflupredone (INN)
isoflurane (INN)
Isohexal (Hexal Australia) [Au]. Redirects to isotretinoin.
isoleucine (INN)
Isolyte

isom-isor
isomazole (INN)
isometamidium chloride (INN)
isomethadone (INN)
isometheptene (INN)
isomolpan (INN)
Isomonit (Hexal Australia) [Au]. Redirects to isosorbide mononitrate.
isoniazid (INN)
isonixin (INN)
Isopaque
isophane insulin (INN)
isoprazone (INN)
isoprednidene (INN)
isoprenaline (INN)
isoprofen (INN)
isopropamide iodide (INN)
isopropicillin (INN)
isopropyl myristate (USAN)
Isoptin
Isopto Cetamide
Isopto Cetapred
Isordil

isos-isox
isosorbide dinitrate (INN)
isosorbide mononitrate (INN)
isosorbide (INN)
isospaglumic acid (INN)
isosulpride (INN)
isothipendyl (INN)
isotiquimide (INN)
Isotonic Gentamicin Sulfate
isotretinoin (INN)
isovaleramide (USAN)
Isovue
isoxaprolol (INN)
isoxepac (INN)
isoxicam (INN)
isoxsuprine (INN)

isp-isu
ispinesib mesylate (USAN)
ispronicline (USAN, (INN))
isradipine (INN)
israpafant (INN)
Istalol
istaroxime (INN)
istradefylline (INN)
Isuprel

it-iv
itameline (INN)
itanoxone (INN)
itasetron (INN)
itazigrel (INN)
itopride (INN)
itraconazole (INN)
itramin tosilate (INN)
itrocainide (INN)
itrocinonide (INN)
iturelix (INN)
IV Persantine
ivabradine (INN)
ivacaftor (USAN)
Ivadantin
ivarimod (INN)
ivermectin (INN)
ivoqualine (INN)
Ivy Block

ix
ixabepilone (USAN)